M. Lynne Murphy is a professor of linguistics at the University of Sussex. She runs the blog Separated by a Common Language under the username Lynneguist, and has written five books. She received a grant from the NEH Public Scholars Program for her most recent book, The Prodigal Tongue.

Studies
Murphy has a B.A. in Linguistics and Philosophy from the University of Massachusetts Amherst, as well as an A.M. and PhD from the University of Illinois at Urbana–Champaign.

Career
Murphy taught at the University of the Witwatersrand in South Africa and Baylor University in Texas. In 2000, she moved to England and began teaching at the University of Sussex where she became a professor.

She has written 5 books: Semantic Relations and the Lexicon, Key Terms in Semantics, Lexical Meaning, Antonyms in English, and The Prodigal Tongue.

Her book The Prodigal Tongue (for which she received a grant from the National Endowment for the Humanities), and her blog Separated by a Common Language, compare American English and British English.

In 2012, she gave a TEDx talk at the University of Sussex, and in 2016 spoke at the Boring Conference.

Selected publications

Books
M. Lynne  Murphy. 2003. Semantic relations and the lexicon: antonymy, synonymy and other paradigms. Cambridge: Cambridge University Press.
M. Lynne Murphy. 2010. Lexical meaning. Cambridge: Cambridge University Press.
Lynne Murphy. 2018. The Prodigal Tongue: The Love-hate Relationship Between American and British English. Penguin.

Journal articles
Steven Jones and M. Lynne Murphy. 2005. "Using corpora to investigate antonym acquisition," International Journal of Corpus Linguistics 10 (3), 401-422.
Steven Jones, Carita Paradis, M Lynne Murphy, and Caroline Willners. 2007. "Googling for ‘opposites’: A Web-based study of antonym canonicity," Corpora 2 (2), 129-154.
M. Lynne Murphy and Steven Jones, 2008. "Antonyms in children's and child-directed speech," First Language 28 (4), 403-430.

References

External links
Murphy's Separated by a Common Language blog

Linguists from the United States
Women linguists
Living people
Year of birth missing (living people)
Semanticists
University of Illinois Urbana-Champaign alumni
Place of birth missing (living people)
University of Massachusetts Amherst College of Humanities and Fine Arts alumni